Psara selenialis is a moth in the family Crambidae. It was described by Snellen in 1895. It is found in Indonesia (Java).

References

Spilomelinae
Moths described in 1895
Moths of Indonesia